Hargens is a surname. Notable people with the surname include:

Charles Hargens (1894−1997), American painter
Dale Hargens (born 1954), American politician

See also
Harens
Hargen, a town in Bergen, North Holland